United Nations General Assembly Resolution 3379, adopted on 10 November 1975 by a vote of 72 to 35 (with 32 abstentions), "determine[d] that Zionism is a form of racism and racial discrimination". It was revoked in 1991 with UN General Assembly Resolution 46/86. The vote on Resolution 3379 took place approximately one year after UNGA 3237 granted the PLO Permanent Observer status, following PLO president Yasser Arafat's "olive branch" speech to the General Assembly in November 1974. The resolution was passed with the support of the Soviet bloc, in addition to the Arab- and Muslim-majority countries, many African countries, and a few others.

Background 

In July 1920, at the San Remo conference, a Class "A" League of Nations mandates over Palestine was allocated to the British. The preamble of the mandate document declared:
Whereas the Principal Allied Powers have also agreed that the Mandatory should be responsible for putting into effect the declaration originally made on November 2nd, 1917, by the Government of His Britannic Majesty, and adopted by the said Powers, in favour of the establishment in Palestine of a national home for the Jewish people, it being clearly understood that nothing should be done which might prejudice the civil and religious rights of existing non-Jewish communities in Palestine, or the rights and political status enjoyed by Jews in any other country. 

On 29 November 1947, the UN General Assembly adopted a resolution recommending "to the United Kingdom, as the mandatory Power for Palestine, and to all other Members of the United Nations the adoption and implementation, with regard to the future government of Palestine, of the Plan of Partition with Economic Union" as Resolution 181 (II). The plan contained a proposal to terminate the British Mandate for Palestine and partition Palestine into "independent Arab and Jewish States and the Special International Regime for the City of Jerusalem." On 14 May 1948, the day on which the British Mandate over Palestine expired, the Jewish People's Council gathered at the Tel Aviv Museum, and approved a proclamation which declared the establishment of a Jewish state in Eretz Israel, to be known as the State of Israel.

On 11 May 1949, Israel was admitted to membership in the United Nations.

The resolution of 1975 

The full text of Resolution 3379:

Response

Israel 

In his address to the United Nations General Assembly the same day, 10 November 1975, Israeli Ambassador Chaim Herzog stated:

Herzog ended his statement, while holding a copy of the resolution, with these words:  As he concluded his speech, Herzog tore the resolution in half.

The name of "The UN avenue" in Haifa, Jerusalem and Tel Aviv was switched to "The Zionism avenue" as a response to the UN's decision.

United States 
Before the vote, Daniel Patrick Moynihan, the United States ambassador to the United Nations, warned that, "The United Nations is about to make anti-Semitism international law." He delivered a speech against the resolution, including the famous line, "[The United States] does not acknowledge, it will not abide by, it will never acquiesce in this infamous act ... A great evil has been loosed upon the world."

In Campbell, California, in the United States, a group of high school students attempted to solicit signatures on the premises of a local shopping center for a petition against Resolution 3379. The result was the landmark U.S. Supreme Court decision in Pruneyard Shopping Center v. Robins (1980) that supported states' rights to expand the exercise of free speech, which California held was legal in what were considered public areas of a shopping mall.

Mexico's vote in favor of the resolution led some United States Jews to organize a tourism boycott of Mexico. This ended after Mexican foreign minister Emilio Óscar Rabasa made a trip to Israel (Rabasa shortly afterward was forced to resign).

Voting record for Resolution 3379

Revocation 
United Nations General Assembly Resolution 46/86, adopted on 16 December 1991, revoked the determination in Resolution 3379, which had called Zionism a form of racism. Israel had made revocation of Resolution 3379 a condition of its participation in the Madrid Peace Conference, in progress in the last quarter of 1991.

The resolution was raised under pressure from the administration of US President George H.W. Bush. The text of the revocation was simply:

"The General Assembly Decides to revoke the determination contained in its resolution 3379 (XXX) of 10 November 1975."

The motion was supported by 111 (including the 90 nations who sponsored the resolution), opposed by 25 nations and abstained by 13 nations.

Voting record for Resolution 46/86

Statement of revocation 
George H. W. Bush personally introduced the motion to revoke 3379 with these words:

See also 
 World Conference against Racism
 African Charter on Human and Peoples' Rights

References

External links 
 United Nations General Assembly Resolution 3379 (10 November 1975) (Official UN site)
 Report of the Plenary Meeting A/PV.2400 (Official UN site)
 Israeli Ambassador Herzog's response to Zionism is racism resolution (10 November 1975)
  Ambassador Moynihan's response to Zionism is racism resolution
 Video footage of Ambassador Herzog concluding his remarks and tearing the resolution in half (10 November 1975)
 American Jewish Committees' extensive archive of materials on the Zionism is Racism controversy

1975 in law
1975 in the United Nations
Anti-Zionism
Criticism of the United Nations
Israeli–Palestinian conflict and the United Nations
November 1975 events
Politics and race
3379
United Nations General Assembly resolutions concerning Israel
Zionism
New antisemitism